Soren Pirjanian also spelled Souren Pirjanian (born 1935) was an Iranian Armenian boxer who became a member of Iran senior national Boxing team in 1955, and was also a member of Tehran Taj Club. He participated as a member of the Iranian boxers at the 1958 Asian Games, in the Welterweight division.
In Tokyo 1958, Pirjanian reached the final of the Welterweight division after defeating both Norberto David from the Philippines, and Toshiro Onuki  from Japan, on points, and eventually won the silver medal of the 67 kg boxing division, after losing on points to Kim Ki-soo from South Korea in the final. He retired from championship boxing and the Iranian national boxing team, after returning from the 1958 Asian Games.

References

Living people
1935 births
Iranian people of Armenian descent
Iranian male boxers
Asian Games medalists in boxing
Boxers at the 1958 Asian Games
Asian Games silver medalists for Iran
Armenian male boxers

Medalists at the 1958 Asian Games
Welterweight boxers